Marcão is an augmentative name meaning Elder Marcos or Elder Marco.

Notable people known by this name include:

 Marcão Britto (born 1970), full name Marco Antônio Valentim Britto Júnior, guitarist of Brazilian rock band Charlie Brown Jr.
 Marcão (handballer) (born 1976), full name Marcos Paulo dos Santos, Brazilian handballer
 Marcão (footballer, born 1965), full name Marco Antônio de Almeida Ferreira, Brazilian footballer
 Marcão (footballer, born 1969), full name Marcos Fernando Nang, Brazilian football striker
 Marcão (footballer, born 1972), full name Marco Aurélio de Oliveira, Brazilian football manager and former footballer
 Marcão (footballer, born 1973), full name Marcos Antonio Aparecido Cipriano, Brazilian footballer
 Marcão (footballer, born 1975), full name Marcos Alberto Skavinski, Brazilian footballer
 Marcão (footballer, born 1976), full name Marcos Aurélio Titon, Brazilian footballer
 Marcão (footballer, born 1985), full name Marcos Assis de Santana, Brazilian footballer
 Marcão (footballer, born 1986), full name Alfredo Marcos da Silva Júnior, Brazilian footballer
 Marcão (footballer, born 1989), full name Marcos da Silva Bonfim, Brazilian footballer
 Marcão (footballer, born 1990), full name Marcus Lima Silva, Brazilian footballer
 Marcão (footballer, born 1991), full name Marcos Antonio Almeida Silva, Brazilian footballer
 Marcão (footballer, born 1994), full name Marcos Vinicius Amaral Alves, Brazilian footballer
 Marcão (footballer, born 1995), full name Marcos Wilson da Silva, Brazilian footballer
 Marcão (footballer, born 1996), full name Marcos do Nascimento Teixeira, Brazilian footballer
 Marcão (futsal player) (born 1984), Brazilian futsal player
 Marcão (basketball), Brazilian basketball player in the 2009–10 NBB season
 Marcos Aparecido Alves, Brazilian footballer in the 2003–04 Taça de Portugal

See also
 Marcos (disambiguation)
 Marquinhos (disambiguation)